The Reynard 89D is a Formula 3000 car, designed and developed by Malcolm Oastler, and constructed and built by Reynard Motorsport, for the 1989 International Formula 3000 Championship.

Racing history
The 89D used one of three different  V8 engines; a Mugen, a Ford-Cosworth, or a Judd.

The model participated in the 1989 season. Thomas Danielsson won the model's debut race at Silverstone, and Jean Alesi became the champion of the series, also driving the 89D.

A modified version of the 89D model, dubbed the 89M, was also constructed. The car was equipped with a Mugen 3.5-liter V8 engine and Formula 1 wheels and served as a test platform for Bridgestone.

References 

Open wheel racing cars
International Formula 3000
Reynard Motorsport vehicles